Mildred Olive Wiley (December 3, 1901 – February 7, 2000) was an American high jumper who won a bronze medal at the 1928 Summer Olympics.

After marriage she changed her last name to Dee and gave birth to five children. One of them, Bob Dee, was a prominent professional footballer at the Boston Patriots in the 1960s.

References
 

1901 births
2000 deaths
People from Taunton, Massachusetts
American female high jumpers
Athletes (track and field) at the 1928 Summer Olympics
Olympic bronze medalists for the United States in track and field
Medalists at the 1928 Summer Olympics
20th-century American women